The Portrait of a Gentleman in a Fur is an oil painting by Paolo Veronese measuring  by , dated to circa 1550–1560 and now in the Galleria Palatina in Florence. Another version exists at the Museum of Fine Arts in Budapest. The painting's subject is unknown: Daniele Barbaro has been suggested, but this is contradicted by a confirmed portrait of him held at the Rijksmuseum in Amsterdam.

Description
A shadowy room hinted at by a wall, fluted pillar, and window forms the backdrop to the knee-length portrait of a man richly dressed in a black cloak lined with ermine fur. He looks intently towards the viewer. He has a long beard and short, greying hair. He holds a white handkerchief in his left hand and grasps the ermine lining of the cloak with his right.

The influence of Titian is evident, though Veronese managed to express his own style in the search for the individuality of the subject and, above all, through the technical mastery evident in the detailed and realistic rendering of the fur.

Provenance
The painting's exact date of completion is unknown, varying from 1549 to 1570 at the broadest extremes. It portrays an unidentified character. Suggestions the figure is Daniele Barbaro seem unlikely when compared to a confirmed portrait of him at the Rijksmuseum.

At some point Cardinal Leopoldo de' Medici purchased the painting through an agent.

A certain T. Vercruyse or T. Ver. Cruyse dal Paradis also made engraved copies of the painting.

References

 

Gentleman in a Fur
Paintings in the collection of the Museum of Fine Arts (Budapest)